Dennis R. Holman (born October 8, 1945) is a former American Basketball Association (ABA) player. In his one season in the ABA with the Dallas Chaparrals, Denny averaged 3.8 points, 1.7 rebounds, and 1.6 assists per game. Holman played college basketball for the SMU Mustangs.

References

1945 births
Living people
American men's basketball players
Anaheim Amigos draft picks
Basketball players from Dallas
Dallas Chaparrals players
Point guards
SMU Mustangs men's basketball players